Clonduff is a civil parish in County Down, Northern Ireland. It is mainly in the historic barony of Iveagh Upper, Lower Half, with one townland in the barony of Iveagh Upper, Upper Half.

Settlements
The civil parish contains the following settlements:
Hilltown

Townlands
Clonduff civil parish contains the following townlands:

Ballyaughian
Ballycoshone Lower
Ballycoshone Upper
Ballygorian Beg
Ballygorian More
Ballykeel
Ballymaghery
Ballynagappoge
Ballynanny
Ballyweely
Cabragh
Carcullion
Cavan
Cleomack
Drumnascamph
Drumbonniff
Goward
Islandmoyle
Kinghill
Leitrim
Lenish
Leode
Lisnamulligan
Mullaghmore
Stang
Tamary

See also
List of civil parishes of County Down

References